The 2011–12 NextGen Series was the inaugural season of the NextGen Series, an association football tournament which involved the under-19 teams from 16 different clubs from across Europe.

Group stage
The 16 teams were sorted into four groups of four, where they played each other home and away in a double round robin format. The top two teams advanced to the knock-out stage of the competition.

Group 1

Kickoff times are in CET.

Group 2

Kickoff times are in CET.

Group 3

Kickoff times are in CET.

Group 4

Kickoff times are in CET.

Knockout stage
Kickoff times are in CET.

Quarter-finals

Semi-finals

3rd place

Final

Top goalscorers

References

2011
NextGen Series